The 2022 Speaker of the Lebanese Parliament election was an election to elect the speaker of the 24th Lebanese Parliament. It was 7th legislative speaker election since the implementation of the Taif Agreement in 1989.

Nabih Berri won with 65 votes out of 128, the minimum needed for a majority and the lowest outcome in his 30-year tenure as the speaker of parliament.

Background

17 October Revolution 

Large-scale anti-government demonstrations ignited in the country from 17 October. Initially triggered in response to a rise in gas and tobacco prices as well as a new tax on messaging applications, the demonstrations quickly turned into a revolution against the stagnation of the economy, unemployment, Lebanon's sectarian and hereditary political system, corruption and the government's inability to provide essential services such as water, electricity and sanitation, Saad Hariri ended up resigning on 29 October 2019.

Hassan Diab was appointed Prime Minister by President Michel Aoun on 19 December 2019. His government obtained the confidence of parliament by 69 votes in its favour.

However, the country's economic situation continued to deteriorate. The government was indebted to the tune of over 95 billion dollars by the end of 2020, the Lebanese pound records a loss of 70% of its value in six months and unemployment affects 35% of the active population. Riots break out in Beirut and Tripoli and Jounieh.

Beirut explosion 

On 4 August 2020, the explosion of several thousand tons of ammonium nitrate stored in a hangar in the Port of Beirut caused considerable human and material damage across the city and the port. The final toll was 218 dead and over 7,000 injured and damage estimated at nearly four billion euros by the World Bank and estimated to have left 300,000 homeless. The industrial-port zone of the Port of Beirut's badly affected, further aggravating the economic situation. Vital for Lebanon, the port is the most important trading centres in Lebanon which ensures the transit of 60% of the country's imports.

Election process

National Pact 

Access to the parliamentary speakership is subject to an informal agreement known as the National Pact. Agreed in 1943, the latter limits this office only to members of the Shia Islam faith.

The National Pact is based on an unwritten agreement concluded in 1943 between the Maronite Christian president Bechara El Khoury and his Sunni prime minister Riad Al Solh when Lebanon gained independence from France. The pact stipulates that the President of the Republic must be a Maronite Christian, the Prime minister a Sunni Muslim and the Speaker of parliament a Shiite Muslim.

Round

Deputy speaker of the Lebanese Parliament election 

The Deputy speaker of the parliament was elected immediately after the speaker.

Access to the deputy speakership is subject to an informal agreement known as the National Pact. Agreed in 1943, the latter limits this office only to members of the Greek Orthodoxy faith.

Potential candidates 

 Ghassan Skaff - Rachaya district MP (Progressive Socialist Party)
 Ghassan Hasbani - Former deputy prime minister (Lebanese Forces)
 Elias Bou Saab - Former defense minister (Free Patriotic Movement)
 Melhem Khallaf - Lebanese lawyer (October 17 reformist)

Rounds 
In the first round, the legislators failed to elect a candidate with over 65 votes for a majority.

The second round, parliament managed to elect former defense minister, Elias Bou Saab of the Free Patriotic Movement, with 65 votes.

Secretaries of the Parliament election 

The 2 secretaries of parliament were elected immediately after the Deputy Speaker. Although not constitutionally required, it was decided that the secretaries would be attributed to one Maronite Christian and one Druze.

The election process of the 2 deputies had large debate particularly by opposition MPs. It was suggested that each MP votes for both preferences in the same ballot. However, it was decided that voting would take place on the basis of one name per ballot. As a result of this Firas Hamdan, an opposition MP, who was one of few candidates for the Druze secretary, withdrew his candidacy in protest of the sectarian electoral procedure.

Rounds 

 - Elected
 - Withdrew

See also 

 Nabih Berri
 2022 Lebanese general election
 2022 Lebanese presidential election

References 

Lebanese legislative speaker elections
2022 in Lebanon
2022 elections in Asia
Nabih Berri
May 2022 events in Lebanon